The Versant District (District 14) is a municipal district in the city of Gatineau, Quebec. It is represented on Gatineau City Council by Daniel Champagne.

The district is located in the Gatineau sector of the city and includes the northern half of Old Gatineau and surrounding subdivisions.

Councillors
Joseph De Sylva (2001-2013)
Daniel Champagne (2013–present)

Election results

2021

2017

2013

2009

2005

2001

References

Districts of Gatineau